Oman Oil Marketing Company SAOG (OOMCO) is an Omani fuel marketing company. OOMCO is involved in the marketing and distribution of fuel and lubricant products and operates in the sectors of  Fuel Retailing, Direct fuel sales to Government and the Commercial sector, Lubricants, Aviation Refueling and Storage and Distribution. 
The company has also begun to diversify and expand their business model into retail and customer services.

History
OOMCO was launched in October 2003, along with its new brand identity, when Oman Oil Company acquired shares of what was formally known as BP Oman in December 2003.

In 2018, OOMCO signed deals with the Muscat Municipality and with Hass Petroleum to supply fuel to the cities fleet of vehicles and to distribute lubricants in Kenya and other Eastern African markets.

In 2018, the company also introduced e-payment via an app at their service stations, partnering with Thawani Technologies.

In September 2018, OOMCO announced plans to expand their network of service stations into Saudi Arabia.

Corporate structure

Management
The Chairman of the board of directors is Mulham Al Jarf and vice-chair is Sayadah Rawan Ahmed Al Saidand. The companies operations are led by A/CEO Hussain Jama B Ishaq Ishaqi.

Shareholder structure
Oman Oil Marketing Companies shares are held by Oman Oil Company (OOC) (49%) and the company is operated under one of OOC's main subsidiaries, the Oman Oil Facilities Development Company (see OOC article for additional details). Other shareholders include Oman Cement Company, BankMuscat and Dhofar International Development and Investment Holding Company.

Operations

Fuels and lubricants
OOMCO's business focus lies in the marketing of fuels and lubricants.

The commercial business supplies all sectors of the economy and is particularly strong in the civil engineering and construction industry. The aviation business has the largest market share at Muscat International Airport and is geared up to cater for the proposed expansion over the next few years. Finally, the lubricants operation markets the prestigious BP and Castrol brands of lubricants throughout the Sultanate.

Retail and rental
The retail business operates all across the Sultanate. The company's 211 retail service stations are owned and operated by Omanis and also offer car maintenance services, such as oil changes, car washes and other service packages. The company also operates 105 "Ahlain" convenience stores across the country, which include everyday products, restaurants and cafés. Another arm of business for OOMCO is the rental of business spaces within their service stations.

Miscellaneous
The company is engaged in different campaigns and efforts to benefit Omani communities. The company has also began including solar-systems into some of their service stations since 2018. They also launched an initiative, called "Solar", in partnership with Nafath Renewable Energy.

References

External links

 Oman Oil Marketing Company
 Company Profile at ArabianBusiness.com

Oil and gas companies of Oman
National oil and gas companies
Oil and gas markets
Companies based in Muscat, Oman